Blair Branch is a stream in Lewis County in the U.S. state of Missouri. It is a tributary of Fabius River.

Blair Branch has the name of Henry Blair, an early settler.

See also
List of rivers of Missouri

References

Rivers of Lewis County, Missouri
Rivers of Missouri